Kandy Falcons, formerly known as Kandy Tuskers and Kandy Warriors, are a Sri Lankan franchise professional Twenty20 cricket team that competes in the Lanka Premier League (LPL), representing the city of Kandy, Sri Lanka which was founded in 2020. Chris Gayle signed up as the marquee overseas player and Kusal Perera as the local icon Player. In October 2021, the team changed their name to Kandy Warriors after changing owners. They further changed their name to Kandy Falcons in 2022.

Seasons

2022 season
The team underwent three ownership and name changes in as many years. In the 2022 edition, the team signed Wanindu Hasaranga as part of the pre-draft signing. Four West Indian players, Carlos Brathwaite, Fabian Allen, Oshane Thomas, and Andre Fletcher were drafted in for the franchise later.

Sponsors

Current squad
 Players with international caps are listed in bold.
  denotes a player who is currently unavailable for selection.
  denotes a player who is unavailable for rest of the season.

Administration and support staff

Captains

Source: ESPNcricinfo, Last updated: 18 Dec 2021

Former players

Statistics

Most runs 

Source: ESPNcricinfo, Last updated: 18 Dec 2021

Most wickets 

Source: ESPNcricinfo, Last Updated:18 Dec 2021

Overall result

 Last updated : 23 December 2022
 Source :ESPNcricinfo

By opposition

 Last updated: 16 December 2022
 Tied+Win - Counted as a win and Tied+Loss - Counted as a loss
 Source : ESPNcricinfo

See also
 Kandy Tuskers in 2020
 Kandy Warriors in 2021
 Kandy Falcons in 2022

References

External links
Official Website

2020 establishments in Sri Lanka
Cricket clubs established in 2020
Lanka Premier League teams